Magda Blanc (March 27, 1879 – April 6, 1959) was a Norwegian actress.

Career

In 1901 she debuted at the National Theater in her hometown of Bergen in the title role in Amalie Skram's play Agnete. She developed into one of the leading actresses at the theater.

Blanc excelled in both dramatic roles and comedies, and she was also a successful poetry reciter. She received the King's Medal of Merit in gold and was appointed a knight 1st class of the Order of St. Olav. In 1954 she was the recipient of a National Artist's Pension.

Family
Blanc was born in Bergen, the daughter of the bank accountant Adolf Christian Blanc (1840–1918) and Magdalene Thomsen (1853–1928). She was the niece of the theater historian Tharald Høyerup Blanc (1838–1921). In 1906, she married the actor Henning Eriksen (1878–1922). They divorced in 1915, and in 1918 she married the composer Sverre Jordan (1889–1972). They divorced in 1949.

References

1879 births
1959 deaths
20th-century Norwegian actresses
Actors from Bergen
Recipients of the King's Medal of Merit in gold
Order of Saint Olav